The boys' 7.5 km sprint biathlon competition at the 2016 Winter Youth Olympics was held on 14 February at the Birkebeineren Ski Stadium.

Results
The race was started at 12:15.

References

Biathlon at the 2016 Winter Youth Olympics